Kuzmich is a surname. Notable people with the surname include:

 Feodor Kuzmich (died 1864), Russian Orthodox starets
 Heather Kuzmich (born 1986), American fashion model
 Mikhail Kuzmich (born 1982), Russian luger
 Pavel Kuzmich (born 1988), Russian luger
 Nicole Kuzmichová or Kuzmich (born 1997), Canadian ice dancer